Live at Wembley or Live at Wembley Stadium may refer to:

 Live at Wembley (Meat Loaf album), 1987
 Live at Wembley (Beyoncé Knowles album), 2004
 Live at Wembley (Bad Company album), 2011
 Live at Wembley (Alter Bridge DVD), 2012
 Live at Wembley (Bring Me the Horizon album), 2015
 Live at Wembley (Babymetal album), 2016
 Live at Wembley '86, a 1992 album by Queen
 Live at Wembley '78, a 1998 album by Electric Light Orchestra
 Live at Wembley July 16, 1988, a 2012 DVD by Michael Jackson
 Live at Wembley Arena, a 2014 album by ABBA
 Live at Wembley Stadium (Spice Girls DVD), 1998
 Live at Wembley Stadium (Genesis DVD), 2003
 Live at Wembley Stadium (Foo Fighters DVD), 2008

See also
 Live from Wembley (disambiguation)